The Computer-Assisted Passenger Prescreening System (often abbreviated CAPPS) is a counter-terrorism system in place in the United States air travel industry. The United States Transportation Security Administration (TSA) maintains a watchlist, pursuant to 49 USC § 114 (h)(2), of "individuals known to pose, or suspected of posing, a risk of air piracy or terrorism or a threat to airline or passenger safety." The list is used to pre-emptively identify terrorists attempting to buy airline tickets or board aircraft traveling in the United States, and to mitigate perceived threats.

Overview 
CAPPS systems rely on what is known as a passenger name record (PNR). When a person books a plane ticket, certain identifying information is collected by the airline: full name, address, etc. This information is used to check against some data store (e.g., a TSA No-Fly list, the FBI ten most wanted fugitive list, etc.) and assign a terrorism "risk score" to that person. High risk scores require the airline to subject the person to extended baggage and/or personal screening, and to contact law enforcement if necessary.

CAPPS I 
CAPPS I was first implemented in the late 1990s, in response to the perceived threat of U.S. domestic and international terrorism. CAPPS I was administered by the FBI and FAA. CAPPS screening selected passengers for additional screening of their checked baggage for explosives. CAPPS selectees did not undergo any additional screening at passenger security checkpoints.

September 11, 2001, attacks 
On the morning of the September 11 attacks, several of the hijackers were selected by CAPPS.  Wail al-Shehri and Satam al-Suqami were selected for extra screening of their checked bags, before they boarded American Airlines Flight 11 at Logan International Airport. Waleed al-Shehri was also selected, but since he had checked no bags, CAPPS selection had no effect on him.  Mohamed Atta was selected by CAPPS when he checked in at Portland International Jetport.

All five of the hijackers on American Airlines Flight 77 were CAPPS selectees, with Hani Hanjour, Khalid al-Mihdhar, and Majed Moqed chosen by the CAPPS criteria. Nawaf al-Hazmi and Salem al-Hazmi were selected because they did not provide adequate identification, and had their checked bags held until they boarded the aircraft.

Ahmad al-Haznawi was the only hijacker selected of those on United Airlines Flight 93, and none of the hijackers of United Airlines Flight 175 were selected by CAPPS.

After 9/11
In November 2001, control was transferred to the TSA, where it has "... expanded almost daily as Intelligence Community (IC) agencies and the Office of Homeland Security continue to request the addition of individuals ..."

In 2003, the Transportation Security Administration (TSA) presented a proposal for an expanded system (CAPPS II), which was reviewed by Congress and later canceled by the United States Department of Homeland Security (DHS).

The Computer Assisted Passenger Prescreening System II was a proposal for a new CAPPS system, designed by the Office of National Risk Assessment (ONRA), a subsidiary office of the TSA, with the contracted assistance of Lockheed Martin. Congress presented the TSA with a list of requirements for a successor to CAPPS I. Some of those requirements were: 

 The government, not the airlines, would control and administer the system
 Every ticketed passenger would be screened, not just those who check bags
 Every airline and every airport would be covered by the system

Like its predecessor, the CAPPS II proposal would rely on the PNR to uniquely identify people attempting to board aircraft. It would expand the PNR field to include a few extra fields, like a full street address, date of birth, and a home telephone number. It would then cross-reference these fields with government records and private sector databases to ascertain the identity of the person, and then determine a number of details about that person. Law enforcement would be contacted in the event that the person was either present on a terrorist or most-wanted list or had outstanding Federal or state arrest warrants for violent crime.

Otherwise, the software would calculate a "risk score" and then print a code on the boarding pass indicating the appropriate "screening level" for that person: green (no threat) indicates no additional screening, yellow (unknown or possible threat) indicates additional screening, and red (high risk) indicates no boarding and deferral to law enforcement. Exactly how this risk score would be calculated was never disclosed nor subject to public oversight of any kind outside of the TSA.

The CAPPS II system was criticized in a report by the United States General Accounting Office in early 2004, and faced increased opposition from watchdog groups like the ACLU, ReclaimDemocracy.org, and Electronic Privacy Information Center. These advocacy groups believed it would undermine both privacy and safety. They expressed concern that the system would be unconstitutional and that terrorists could use it to their advantage.

CAPPS II was cancelled by the TSA in the summer of 2004. Shortly thereafter, the TSA announced a successor program, called Secure Flight, that would work much the same way as CAPPS II. TSA hoped to test Secure Flight in August 2005 using two airlines. Secure Flight has been blocked by Congress until the government can prove that the system can pass 10 tests for accuracy and privacy protection as follows:

 Redress process - A system of due process exists whereby aviation passengers determined to pose a threat are either delayed or prohibited from boarding their scheduled flights by TSA may appeal such decisions and correct erroneous information contained in CAPPS II or Secure Flight or other follow-on/successor programs. 
 Accuracy of databases and effectiveness of Secure Flight - The underlying error rate of the government and private databases that will be used to both establish identity and assign a risk level to a passenger will not produce a large number of false positives that will result in a significant number of passengers being treated mistakenly or security resources being diverted. 
 Stress testing - TSA has stress-tested and demonstrated the efficacy and accuracy of all search technologies in CAPPS II or Secure Flight or other follow-on/successor programs and has demonstrated that CAPPS II or Secure Flight or other follow-on/successor programs can make an accurate predictive assessment of those passengers who may constitute a threat to aviation. 
 Internal oversight - The Secretary of Homeland Security has established an internal oversight board to monitor the manner in which CAPPS II or Secure Flight or other follow-on/successor programs are being developed and prepared. 
 Operational safeguards - TSA has built in sufficient operational safeguards to reduce the opportunities for abuse. 
 Security measures - Substantial security measures are in place to protect CAPPS II or Secure Flight or other follow-on/successor programs from unauthorized access by hackers or other intruders. 
 Oversight of system use and operation - TSA has adopted policies establishing effective oversight of the use and operation of the system. 
 Privacy concerns - There are no specific privacy concerns with the technological architecture of the system. 
 Modifications with respect to intrastate travel to accommodate states with unique air transportation needs - TSA has, in accordance with the requirements of section 44903 (j)(2)(B) of title 49, United States Code, modified CAPPS II or Secure Flight or other follow-on/successor programs with respect to intrastate transportation to accommodate states with unique air transportation needs and passengers who might otherwise regularly trigger primary selectee status. 
 Life-cycle cost estimates and expenditure plans - Appropriate life-cycle cost estimates, and expenditure and program plans exist.

Surveillance Detection Report (SDR)
On July 21, 2006, TV station KMGH-TV (ABC 7) in Denver, Colorado, released a report, citing air marshals that were using a quota system of reporting one person per month as a requirement for advancement. These reports are filed as Surveillance Detection Reports: it is unclear how many such reports are required on a person to place them on the watchlists.

See also 
 Terrorist Identities Datamart Environment
 Secondary Security Screening Selection
 No Fly List

References

External links
 The Electronic Privacy Information Center (April 2003). Documents Show Errors in TSA's "No-Fly" Watchlist.
TSA customer service
 DenverChannel.com, accessed 7-25-2006: article on SDR

CAPPS II
 CAPPS II Section of HR 2115, the "Century of Aviation Reauthorization Act" The language of proposed legislation (aclu.org)
 The Transportation Security Administration, promoters of CAPPS II
 EFF Backgrounder on CAPPS II
 The Dangerous Illusion of CAPPS II A critical article exploring multiple concerns with CAPPS II (reclaimdemocracy.org)
 ACLU page on CAPPS II
 "Computer-Assisted  Passenger  Prescreening System  Faces Significant  Implementation Challenges" (pdf) summary of report on CAPPS II by the General Accounting Office
 blog providing regular updates on CAPPS II
 "In These Times" 2003 article on CAPPS II

Identity documents of the United States
Aviation in the United States

Counterterrorism intelligence

Aviation security
Lockheed Martin
Transportation Security Administration